A Moonie is a member of the Unification Church of the United States.

Moonie may also refer to:
A member of the worldwide Unification movement
A fan of the manga and anime franchise Sailor Moon

Characters 
Moon Knight, Marvel Comics character, nicknamed Moonie by fans
Moonie, character in New Waterford Girl
Moonie, character in comic book series by Nick Cuti

People 
Moonie (surname)
Otto Miller (catcher) or Moonie, American baseball player
Brendan Moon or Moonie (born 1958), Australian rugby player
Keith Moon or Moonie (1946–1978), rock and roll drummer
Clifford "Moonie" Pusey, former guitarist for Steel Pulse

Places 
Moonie, Queensland, town in Australia
Moonie Highway, road in Australia
Moonie River, river in Australia

Other uses
Moonie (dog), a canine actor
The Moonies, British rock band

See also
Mooney, Irish surname, sometimes spelled "Moonie"
Mount Moonie, mountain in Antarctica 
Mooney (disambiguation)
Moony (born 1980), Italian musician
Mouni (disambiguation)
Super Moonies, German pop band